When Things Were Rotten is an American sitcom television series created in 1975 by Mel Brooks. It aired for half a season on the ABC network. A parody of the Robin Hood legend, the series starred Dick Gautier (who earlier had played Hymie the Robot in Brooks' Get Smart series) as the handsome and heroic Robin Hood. The series received mostly critical acclaim, though John Leonard wrote that watching it was "like being locked inside a package of bubblegum where the only card is Alvin Dark." It failed to find an audience and was cancelled after 13 episodes. The Bionic Woman was its midseason replacement, and became a great success. Eighteen years later, Brooks produced another Robin Hood parody, the feature film Robin Hood: Men in Tights. 

The complete series was released on DVD in 2013 as a manufactured-on-demand item exclusively available on Amazon.com's CreateSpace.

Cast

Episodes

References

External links

 

1970s American sitcoms
American Broadcasting Company original programming
Television series set in the Middle Ages
Robin Hood television series
Television series by CBS Studios
1975 American television series debuts
1975 American television series endings
Television series created by Mel Brooks
English-language television shows
Television shows set in London
Robin Hood parodies